Aizoanthemopsis is a genus of flowering plants belonging to the family Aizoaceae. It contains a single species, Aizoanthemopsis hispanica.

Its native range is Macaronesia, Mediterranean to Arabian Peninsula.

References

Aizoaceae
Aizoaceae genera
Monotypic Caryophyllales genera